The European Mixed Team Badminton Championships is a tournament organized by the Badminton Europe (BE), held once every two years to crown the best badminton mixed national team in Europe.

It was played just before the European Badminton Championships, the individual competition, in the same venue. However, the European team tournament was split from the European individual event for the first time in 2009.

During the tournament, each tie comprises five matches: men and women's singles, men and women's doubles, and mixed doubles.

Location of the European Mixed Team Badminton Championships

Past medalists

Medal table

References

External links 
 European Mixed Team Championships

 
International badminton competitions
Recurring sporting events established in 1972
1972 establishments in Europe